is a former Nippon Professional Baseball infielder. He is the current farm manager for the Chunichi Dragons.

External links

1969 births
Living people
Baseball people from Kyoto Prefecture
Japanese baseball players
Nippon Professional Baseball infielders
Nippon Ham Fighters players
Hanshin Tigers players
Japanese baseball coaches
Nippon Professional Baseball coaches
Academic staff of Ashiya University